Geshi or Gashi may refer to:
 Geshi, Deyr
 Geshi, Tangestan